Shul, meaning school in Yiddish, is another term for synagogue.

Shul may also refer to:

Places in Iran

Bushehr Province
 Shul, Dashtestan, a village
 Shul, Ganaveh, a village

Fars Province
Shul, Mohr, a village
Shul, Sepidan, a village
Kalgah, Fars, Sepidan County, a village also known as Shūl
Shul, Shiraz, a village

Other uses
Brian Shul (born 1948), retired United States Air Force pilot and officer

See also
Other places in Fars Province:
Shul-e Bozi, Marvdasht County
Shul-e Bozorg, Marvdasht County
Shul-e Sarui, Marvdasht County
Shul-e Dalkhan, Sepidan County
Shool, a 1999 Indian Hindi-language action crime film